Perkins Bass (October 6, 1912 – October 25, 2011) was an American elected official from the state of New Hampshire, including four terms as a U.S. representative from 1955 to 1963.

Biography
Bass was born on October 6, 1912, in East Walpole, Massachusetts. He was the eldest son of former New Hampshire Governor Robert P. Bass and First Lady Edith B. Bass.  Bass attended Milton Academy, graduated from Dartmouth College in 1934, and from Harvard Law School. He practiced as a lawyer and  served in the United States Army Air Forces in Asia during World War II. He was elected state representative in 1939, 1941, 1947, and 1951, and as state senator in 1949, all to two-year terms. Bass voted in favor of the Civil Rights Acts of 1957 and 1960, but voted present on the 24th Amendment to the U.S. Constitution.

After serving four terms in the U.S. Congress, he ran unsuccessfully for the U.S. Senate in a 1962 special election. After defeating interim Senator Maurice J. Murphy Jr., Doloris Bridges, and Congressman Chester Merrow in the Republican primary, he was defeated in the general election by Democrat Thomas J. McIntyre. From 1972 to 1976, he served as a selectman of Peterborough, New Hampshire, where he lived until his death in 2011, aged 99.

Family
 Charles F. Bass, the U.S. representative from New Hampshire's 2nd congressional district (son)
 Robert P. Bass, the governor of New Hampshire from 1911 to 1913 (father)

References 

1912 births
2011 deaths
Dartmouth College alumni
Harvard Law School alumni
Republican Party members of the New Hampshire House of Representatives
New Hampshire lawyers
Republican Party New Hampshire state senators
Presidents of the New Hampshire Senate
United States Army Air Forces pilots of World War II
Republican Party members of the United States House of Representatives from New Hampshire
20th-century American politicians
People from Peterborough, New Hampshire
People from Walpole, Massachusetts
Military personnel from New Hampshire
20th-century American lawyers
Military personnel from Massachusetts